Stefan Crnojević (1469–1499), or Stephen II was a nominal ruler of the Principality of Zeta between 1496 and 1499.

Conspiring with Ottomans against Đurađ 
Until 1496, the ruler of Zeta had been Stefan's older brother Đurađ Crnojević, who maintained frequent correspondence with other Christian feudal states with intention to establish an anti-Ottoman coalition. When his brother Stefan betrayed him to the Ottomans in 1496, Đurađ proposed to accept Ottoman suzerainty under Feriz Beg, if they accepted to recognize him as governor in Zeta. Feriz Beg refused the proposal and invited Đurađ to either come to Scutari to clarify his anti-Ottoman activities, or to flee Zeta. When Feriz Beg attacked Zeta with strong forces in 1496, Đurađ decided to flee to the Republic of Venice.

Lord of Zeta 
Stefan remained in Zeta hoping that the Ottomans would accept his suzerainty, but they only used him in order to easier gain control over his domains. Stefan was lord of Zeta only nominally, while Ottomans collected taxes from its population. In 1497 Feriz Beg captured Grbalj and put it under his effective military control, although it was still part of Zeta governed by Stefan Crnojević. In 1499 Feriz Beg formally annexed Zeta to the territory of his Sanjak of Scutari, after he became suspicious toward Stefan because of his contacts with Venice. Feriz Beg then invited Stefan Crnojević to Scutari, where he had him imprisoned. Stefan probably died in prison since he was never mentioned again in historical sources. According to some authors, after his brother had fled Zeta, Stefan was only an Ottoman spahi, who in 1499 went to Hilandar and became a monk, taking the monastic name Marko.

Ancestry

References

Sources 
 
 
 
 
 
 
 
 

15th-century births
1499 deaths
15th-century rulers in Europe
15th-century Serbian nobility
Stefan 2
Ottoman vassalage